Polanów  is a village in the administrative district of Gmina Samborzec, within Sandomierz County, Świętokrzyskie Voivodeship, in south-central Poland.

The village has a population of 334.

The village dates back to the Middle Ages, it was first mentioned in old Polish chronicles in the 13th century.

References

Villages in Sandomierz County